Peter Hidien (born 14 November 1953 in Koblenz) is a retired German football player. He spent ten seasons in the Bundesliga with Hamburger SV.

Honours
Hamburger SV
 Bundesliga: 1978–79, 1981–82
 DFB-Pokal: 1975–76; runner-up: 1973–74
 European Cup Winners' Cup: 1976–77
 European Cup runner-up: 1979–80
 UEFA Cup runner-up: 1981–82

References

External links
 

1953 births
Living people
German footballers
Hamburger SV players
Bundesliga players
Association football defenders
Sportspeople from Koblenz
West German footballers
Footballers from Rhineland-Palatinate